Whose Side Are You On? is the debut album by British band Matt Bianco, released in 1984. For this album, Matt Bianco was a trio of Basia Trzetrzelewska (vocals), Mark Reilly (vocals), and Danny White (keyboards).

The album contains the band's first five UK Singles Chart hits, including "Get Out of Your Lazy Bed", "Sneaking Out the Back Door", "Matt's Mood", "Half a Minute" and "More Than I Can Bear". All are sung by Trzetrzelewska and Reilly, except "Matt's Mood" which is an instrumental.

Track listings 
The original vinyl record featured 10 tracks.  The cassette edition had 12 tracks, adding two bonus tracks: the 12" version of "Big Rosie" (B-side of the band's debut 12" "Get Out of Your Lazy Bed"), and "The Other Side", the instrumental B-side of the 7" single "Whose Side Are You On?". Additionally, the versions of "More Than I Can Bear", "Half a Minute", "Matt’s Mood", "Get Out of Your Lazy Bed" and "Sneaking Out the Back Door" on the cassette are different from the versions heard on the vinyl/CD edition.

The CD edition was released slightly later, and was one of the earliest pop music compact discs to be released in the music industry.

LP/CD 
All tracks written by Reilly/White except "Whose Side Are You On?" by Reilly/White/Ross, and "Half a Minute" by Reilly/White/Poncioni.

 "Whose Side Are You On?" (Extended Version) – 4:32 
 "More Than I Can Bear" – 4:15 
 "No No Never" – 3:43 
 "Half a Minute" – 3:49 
 "Matt's Mood" – 5:19 
 "Get Out of Your Lazy Bed" – (Single Version) 3:28
 "It's Getting Late" – 3:20 
 "Sneaking Out the Back Door" – 3:46 
 "Riding with the Wind" – 3:22 
 "Matt's Mood II" – 5:15

MC 
All tracks written by Reilly/White except "Whose Side Are You On?" by Reilly/White/Ross; "Half a Minute" and "Big Rosie" by Reilly/White/Poncioni.

 "Whose Side Are You On?" (Extended Version) – 4:32
 "More Than I Can Bear" (Remix) – 4:44 
 "No No Never" – 3:43 
 "Half a Minute" (Extended Version) – 4:49 
 "Matt's Mood" (Remix) – 5:29
 "Big Rosie" (Extended Version) – 6:07
 "Get Out of Your Lazy Bed" (Extended Version) – 4:30
 "It's Getting Late" – 3:20
 "Sneaking Out the Back Door" (Extended Version) – 4:46
 "Riding with the Wind" – 3:22 
 "Matt's Mood II" – 5:15
 "The Other Side" – 4:14

Singles from the album
11 February 1984 – "Get Out of Your Lazy Bed" (UK Singles Chart No. 15 – 8 weeks)
14 April 1984/5 May 1984 – "Sneaking Out the Back Door"/"Matt's Mood" (UK # 44 – 7 weeks) ("Matt's Mood" only credited from 5 May)
13 July 1984 – "Whose Side Are You On?" (UK No. 83) (AUS No. 57)
10 November 1984 – "Half a Minute" (UK No. 23 – 10 weeks)
2 March 1985 – "More Than I Can Bear" (UK No. 50 – 7 weeks)

Personnel

Band
Mark Reilly – vocals and production
Basia Trzetrzelewska – vocals and arrangement of vocal harmonies
Danny White – keyboards and production

Production
Peter Collins for Loose End Productions – production on "Big Rosie"
Phil Harding – sound engineer on all tracks except "Matt's Mood", "Get Out of Your Lazy Bed" and "Sneaking Out the Back Door", and mixing on all tracks except "Matt's Mood"
John Buckley – sound engineer on "Matt's Mood", "Get Out of Your Lazy Bed" and "Sneaking Out the Back Door", mixing on "Matt's Mood"

Musicians
Robin Jones – percussion on all tracks except "Get Out of Your Lazy Bed" and "Sneaking Out the Back Door"
Ronnie Ross – baritone sax on "No No Never", "Half a Minute", "Matt's Mood", "Get Out of Your Lazy Bed", "Matt's Mood II" and "The Other Side"
Peter White – acoustic guitar on "Half a Minute"
Charles Morgan – drums on "Whose Side Are You On?" (title track)
Guy Barker – flugelhorn on "More Than I Can Bear"
Chris Dean – trombone on "It's Getting Late"
Luke Tanny – trumpet on "Sneaking Out the Back Door"
Peter Ross – drums and percussion on "Big Rosie", "Get Out of Your Lazy Bed" and "Sneaking Out the Back Door"
Ray Warleigh – flute on "Big Rosie"
Kito Poncioni – music on "Big Rosie"

Staff
Jallé Bakke – hair and make up
Monica Curtin – photography
Simon Pickford – graphics
Trina Baer – clothes
Peter White, Brian Carr, Richard Evans, Oliver "The Lizard" Smallman, and WEA – special thanks and collaboration
Matt Music Ltd – publishers
Matt Music Ltd/Rondor Music (London Ltd) – publishers for "Whose Side Are You On?" (title track)

Charts and certifications

Weekly charts

Certifications

Release details

References

External links
 Matt Bianco's official site

1984 debut albums
Matt Bianco albums
Albums produced by Peter Collins (record producer)